Osain is a village in the west-central part of Bihiya block in Bhojpur district, Bihar, India. As of 2011, its population was 6,308, in 966 households.

References 

Villages in Bhojpur district, India